Rodrigo Pedro Godoy (born 29 October 1989) is an Argentine professional footballer who plays as a midfielder for Deportivo Merlo.

Career
Godoy's first experience of first-team football came with Deportivo Riestra, making his bow in Primera D Metropolitana during the 2004–05 campaign. That was his sole senior appearance until 2010, when he played the first of fifty-two fixtures for fellow fifth tier team Sportivo Barracas; though his first match for the club came in Primera C Metropolitana, prior to their relegation in 2009–10. After leaving Sportivo Barracas, Godoy spent the 2013–14 season with Yupanqui. In 2015, following a six-month stint with Juventud Unida, Godoy joined General Lamadrid. He scored four goals in nineteen total games, before departing to sign for Estudiantes.

In 2016, after appearances for Estudiantes versus Platense, Fénix and Comunicaciones in Primera B Metropolitana, Godoy completed a move to fourth tier team Sportivo Italiano. He remained for two years, participating in thirty-six fixtures and netting three goals. On 3 August 2018, Godoy returned to the third tier after being signed by Acassuso. His debut didn't arrive until 18 March 2019, as he came off the bench in an away defeat to UAI Urquiza.

Career statistics
.

References

External links

1989 births
Living people
People from San Fernando Partido
Argentine footballers
Association football midfielders
Primera D Metropolitana players
Primera C Metropolitana players
Primera B Metropolitana players
Deportivo Riestra players
Sportivo Barracas players
Club Social y Deportivo Yupanqui players
Juventud Unida de San Miguel players
General Lamadrid footballers
Estudiantes de Buenos Aires footballers
Sportivo Italiano footballers
Club Atlético Acassuso footballers
Deportivo Merlo footballers
Sportspeople from Buenos Aires Province